Rajkanya may refer to:

 Rajkanya (1955 film), a 1955 Hindi Bollywood film
 Rajkanya (1965 film), a 1965 Bengali film